Dawa Narbula (born 16 December 1935) was a member of the 14th Lok Sabha of India. He represented the Darjeeling constituency of West Bengal and is a member of the Indian National Congress (INC) political party.

He was elected to the West State Assembly from Kurseong in 1977.

References

External links
 Official biographical sketch in Parliament of India website

Living people
1935 births
Indian National Congress politicians
People from Darjeeling district
India MPs 2004–2009
Lok Sabha members from West Bengal
Indian Gorkhas